Altner is a surname. Notable people with the surname include:

Georg Altner (1901–1945), German politician
Günter Altner (1936–2011), German biologist, theologian, ecologist, environmentalist, writer, and lecturer
Stefan Altner, German musician, musicologist, and manager
Zdenek Altner (born 1947), Czech lawyer and advocate